Paju is a city in Gyeonggi Province, South Korea. Paju was made a city in 1997; it had previously been a county (gun).

In 2015, the population of Paju was over 427,000. To defend the South Korean capital, Seoul, many U.S. and South Korean Army bases are set up in the area.
In 2002, the northernmost South Korean railway station, Dorasan, was opened. North Korean territory and Kaesong City can be seen from Mount Dora in the city.

City symbols

Cosmos

Cosmos is Paju City's representative of flowers growing wild in Spring. It has very strong vitality, and symbolize unity and harmonious life as a citizen of Paju City. The flowers have different colors, including pale pink and red.

Gingko

Ginkgos are usually planted as street trees. People can obtain high-quality wood from them. Also, their leaves and fruits are used as a valuable medicine.

Pigeon

Pigeons are meek and gentle with soft feathers which follow humans well. They symbolize the peace and security of mankind, and they mean to desire the unification of the Korean Peninsula and the well-being of citizens.

Badge of Paju City

The badge brings the look of Paju implicitly. Semiconductors, which symbolize high-tech industry, high-quality culture and books, and life based on the shape of the rice industry have represented the badge with the symbol Paju logo.

Geography
Paju has east and west low type of geographic trait. Many mountains are located in eastern Paju, assemble to create the border with Yangzhou. In northern Paju, mountains form the border with Goyang. Moreover, in central Paju some lower mountains spread toward south. For the major rivers in Paju, there are Imjin River and Han River. Imjin River flows between northern west and west, and Han River flows in western south of Paju.

Climate
Paju has a monsoon-influenced humid continental climate (Köppen: Dwa) with cold, dry winters and hot, rainy summers. The average annual temperature of Paju is 11 ℃, the average January temperature is -4.6 ℃ and the average temperature is 25 ℃ in August. Lastly, annual precipitation of Paju is around 1,300 mm.

Tourist attractions

Heyri Art Valley

Heyri Art Valley is the largest art village in South Korea and its Korean culture and many genres of art attract visitors. The area includes residences, workrooms and galleries for artists, museums and performance spaces designed by artists. It was planned from 1998 and its name Heyri is derived from a traditional farming song of Paju. Architects tried to combine the view of nature with the valley when they make plan. The valley hosts art performances appealing to audiences of all ages. The attractive theme brings people to visit every weekend, and more people visit the valley in spring and autumn because it holds art festival during the seasons.

Specialties

Jangdan bean

Jangdan beans are one of Paju’s famous traditional specialties. From a long time ago, crops have been important for Korean people’s livelihood because their land and environment were suited for agriculture. Therefore, two major crops, rice and bean, have been developed over time. Jangdan bean is one of these crops which have been harvested in Paju. The name Jangdan is derived from the name of a village in Paju, which existed before the Korean War. Even though the village is now gone, people still call the bean the Jangdan bean because the former village was so well known for these beans. Today, Jangdan beans are only commonly seen In Panmunjom which is located at the border between South Korea and North Korea.

Education
The city has 3 polytechnic universities including Doowon Technical University College.

Paju English Village 

Paju English Village is a huge area which was constructed to teach children English and let them experience western culture. Hundreds of foreign teachers are hired in the village. The educational village pushes ahead various curriculum to provide several educational programs called "English Camp". To attend the programs, children's parents have to pay and send children to the village for several days. The length of the program is depending on the type of program. People also visit the village because of its visual and new cultural atmosphere.

Sports 
Paju Challengers, an independent baseball team, has been based in the city.

Administrative divisions
Paju is divided as follows:
 Beobwon-eup (법원읍)
 Paju-eup (파주읍)
 Munsan-eup (문산읍)
 Jori-eup (조리읍)
 Wollong-myeon (월롱면)
 Papyeong-myeon (파평면)
 Jeokseong-myeon (적성면)
 Gwangtan-myeon (광탄면)
 Tanhyeon-myeon (탄현면)
 Gunnae-myeon (군내면)
 Jangdan-myeon (장단면)
 Jinseo-myeon (진서면)
 Jindong-myeon (진동면)
 Gyoha-dong (교하동)
 Geumchon1(il)-dong (금촌1동)
 Geumchon-dong (금촌동)
 Adong-dong (아동동)
 Yadong-dong (야동동)
 Geomsan-dong (검산동)
 Maekgeum-dong (맥금동)
 Geumchon-2(ii)-dong (금촌2동)
 Geumchon-dong (금촌동)
 Geumneung-dong (금능동)
 Unjeong 1(il)-dong (운정1동)
 Gyoha-dong (교하동)
 Dangha-dong (당하동)
 Wadong-dong (와동동)
 Unjeong 2(i)-dong (운정2동)
 Mokdong-dong (목동동)
 Unjeong 3(Sam)-dong (운정3동)
 Dongpae-dong (동패동)
 Yadang-dong (야당동)

Military bases
 Camp Bonifas and Camp Liberty-Bell (home to US/ROKA Joint Security Area)
 Camp Dodge – closed
 Camp Edwards – closed
 Camp Garry Owen – closed
 Camp Giant – closed
 Camp Greaves – closed
 Camp Howze – closed
 Camp Irwin – closed
 Camp Pelham – closed
 Camp Semper Fidelis (home of 1st Provisional DMZ Police Co., 1st Marine Div. 1953–1956)
 Camp Stanton – closed
 Multi-Purpose Live Fire Complex (MLFC), also called Rodriguez Range or Rodriguez Live Fire Complex

Military cemetery
The Cemetery for North Korean and Chinese Soldiers was established in 1996 to hold the remains of Korean People's Army and Chinese People's Volunteer Army soldiers killed during the Korean War. In March 2014 the Chinese remains were repatriated for reburial in Shenyang, China.

Attractions
 Gloucester Valley Battle Monument ("Gloster Hill") – war memorial
 Heyri Art Valley – with 350 artists in fine arts, music, theater, photography, sculpture, crafts and literature. It aims to promote cultural interchange, education, and exhibit and sell hand-crafted works of art.
 Jayuro Road of Freedom
 Panmunjom
 Korean Demilitarized Zone
 Paju Book City
 Tongilro Road of Unification or National Road No. 1
 Yong Ju Gol – a red-light district

Notable people
Sim Sang-jung, former leader of the Justice Party (South Korea), member of the National Assembly (South Korea) representing Gyeonggi Goyang A, and 2017 South Korean presidential election.
Kim Young-moo, poet and scholar
Ahn Jung-Hwan, professional footballer and show host
Cho Jae-jin, professional footballer
Yoon Do-hyun, musician, lead singer of YB
Kang Jiyoung, pop singer and actress, former member of South Korean girl group Kara
Hwang Kwanghee, member of South Korean boy group ZE:A
Lee Mi-Swel, contestant on K-pop Star, a South Korean talent show competition.
Choi Ji-woo, South Korean actress
Kim Eun-jung, children's writer
Park Shin-hye, South Korean actress
Park Myung-keun, South Korean politician and four-time elected member of the National Assembly (South Korea).
Kim Da-mi, South Korean Actress
Paull Shin, American educator and politician 
Danielle Marsh, member of South Korean girl group NewJeans

In popular culture
 It is the location of the 2009 film Paju, starring by Lee Sun-kyun and Seo Woo.
 Parts of Burning, South Korea's 2018 submission for the Academy Award for Best Foreign Language Film, are set in Paju.
 The Mnet survival show Produce 101 were filmed at the English Village.
The Mnet survival show I-Land were filmed at the CJ E&M Contents World.
The 2020 Mnet Asian Music Awards were filmed at the CJ E&M Contents World.

Sister cities
Paju is twinned with the following places:

Coquitlam, British Columbia, Canada
Cuenca, Castilla–La Mancha, Spain
Toowoomba, Queensland, Australia
Eskişehir, Turkey
Hadano, Kanagawa, Japan
Jinzhou, Liaoning, China
Mudanjiang, Heilongjiang, China
Pasadena, California, United States
Stellenbosch, South Africa

See also
List of cities in South Korea

References

External links

City government website 
City Council website 
road from DPRK to Paju

 

 
Cities in Gyeonggi Province